The 2006 Pacific Curling Championships were held in Tokyo, Japan Nov. 21-26.

Men's

Final round-robin standings

Playoffs
Tie breaker:  8-4 
Semifinals (best of 3): 
 4-3  (11);  8-4  
 8-3 ;  5-4  (11);  8-6 
5th place:  7-5 
Bronze:  9-8  (11)
Gold:  8-5

Women's

Final round-robin standings

Playoffs
Semifinals (best of 3)
 8-5 ;  8-1 
 6-4 ;  9-6 
Bronze:  10-3 
Gold:  8-3

External links

Pacific Curling Championships, 2006
Pacific-Asia Curling Championships
2006 in Japanese sport
International curling competitions hosted by Japan